Robert Hay (2 March 1880 – 27 December 1959) was an Australian rules footballer who played with Fitzroy in the Victorian Football League (VFL).

Family
The son of Presbyterian cleric George Hay (1843-1928), and Elizabeth McKelvie Hay (1847-1926), née McKenzie, Robert Hay was born in Ardrossan, Scotland on 2 March 1880.

His younger brother, John McKenzie Hay (1886–1958), played with Collingwood in the VFL.

He married Alice Anderson Dobie (1889-1944) on 20 December 1912; they had four daughters, Ethel, Jean, Lorna, and Olive.

Education
He attended Scotch College, Melbourne. He graduated Bachelor of Arts (B.A.) from the University of Melbourne on 11 May 1901.

Death
He died in Melbourne on 27 December 1959.

Footnotes

References
 (GS): Scotch's first 66 VFL/AFL Players, Great Scot, (September 2010), Scotch College, Melbourne.
 Holmesby, Russell & Main, Jim (2009). The Encyclopedia of AFL Footballers. 8th ed. Melbourne: Bas Publishing.

External links
 
 

1880 births
1959 deaths
VFL/AFL players born outside Australia
People educated at Scotch College, Melbourne
University of Melbourne alumni
Australian rules footballers from Victoria (Australia)
Fitzroy Football Club players